The Oaxacan cat-eyed snake (Tantalophis discolor) is a species of snake in the family Colubridae. It is the only species in the genus Tantalophis. 

It is found in Mexico.

References 

Colubrids
Reptiles of Mexico
Reptiles described in 1860
Taxa named by Albert Günther